Oh! My Baby was a South Korean reality television show that aired on SBS every Saturday at 17:05 beginning January 13, 2014. Under a comedic premise, it documents the family life of various South Korean celebrities and their young children. On August 8, 2016, sources confirmed that SBS canceled the show after two years due to low ratings. The final episode aired on August 20, 2016.

Starring Families

Past families
 Lee Eun (mother)
 Mir (uncle), Go Eun Ah (aunt), Jo Ha Jin (nephew)
 Choi Ro-woon (5 years old)
 Shin Goo
 Im Hyun-sik (grandfather), Kim Ju-hwan (grandchild, 5 years old)
 Im Ha-ryong (grandfather), Im So Hyun (grandchild, 6 years old)
 Kang Leo (father), Park Seon-ju (mother), Kang Sol Amy (daughter, 3 years old)
 Kim Jung-min (father), Rumiko Tani (mother), Kim Tae-yang (eldest son, 10 years old), Kim Do-yoon (second son, 9 years old), Kim Dam-yool (third son, 4 years old)
 Kim Tae-woo (father), Kim Ae-ri (mother), Kim So-yul (eldest daughter, 5 years old), Kim Ji-yul (second daughter, 4 years old), Kim Hae-yul (son, 2 years old)
 Son Jun-ho (father), Kim So-hyun (mother), Son Joo-ahn (son, 5 years old)
Ricky Kim (father), Ryu Seung-joo (mother), Kim Tae-rin (daughter), Kim Tae-oh (son), Kim Tae-ra (daughter)
 Seo Ho (father), Sa Gang (mother),  So Heun (daughter), Chae Heun [Mem Mem] (daughter)

Special appearances families
 Kim Geon-woo (father), Park Sharon (mother), Kim Su-ha (daughter, 3 years old), Kim Yun-seok (son, one year old)
 Huh Gak (father), Lee Su-yeon (mother), Huh-geon (eldest son, 2 years), Huh-gang (second son, one year old)

Ratings

2015

2016

References

External links
 

2013 South Korean television series debuts
Korean-language television shows
South Korean reality television series
Seoul Broadcasting System original programming
Parenting television series